Martin Ziguélé (born 12 February 1957) is a Central African politician who was Prime Minister of the Central African Republic from 2001 to 2003. He placed second in the 2005 presidential election and is currently the President of the Movement for the Liberation of the Central African People (MLPC).

Life and career
Ziguélé was appointed as Prime Minister on 1 April 2001 by President Ange-Félix Patassé, replacing Anicet-Georges Dologuélé. He had previously lived in Lomé, Togo for twenty years and was an executive member of the MLPC. He also hold the portfolio of Minister of Finance. Ziguélé left office when rebel leader François Bozizé took power upon capturing the capital, Bangui, on 15 March 2003.  Ziguélé was allowed to go into exile in France.

Ziguélé was initially barred from running in the 2005 presidential election, along with six other candidates, by a court ruling on December 30, 2004. He was subsequently reinstated as a candidate by Bozizé, along with two other candidates, on January 4. Later in January, all barred candidates, with the lone exception of Patassé, were allowed to run; following this, Patassé's party, the MLPC, backed Ziguélé for the election. Previously, he had been running as an independent. The election was held on March 13, 2005, and Ziguélé placed second with 23.5% of the votes according to official results. He faced Bozizé in a second round of voting, and tried to distance himself from Patassé in campaigning, but was defeated and took 35.4% of the vote.

Ziguélé was elected as President of the MLPC on a provisional basis for one year at an extraordinary party congress in late June 2006, while Patassé was suspended from the party. On June 23, 2007, at the end of the MLPC's third ordinary congress, Ziguélé was elected to a three-year term as President.

In the December 2015 presidential election, Ziguélé stood as the MLPC candidate and placed fourth. In the February–March 2016 parliamentary election, he was elected to the National Assembly as the MLPC candidate in the third constituency of Bocaranga, winning in the first round with 66.25%% of the vote.

In October 2021, The COD-2020 coalition, Crépin Mboli-Goumba’s Patrie party and Martin Ziguélé’s Central African People’s Liberation Movement withdrew their representatives from the organizing committee and denounced “a desire to sabotage the Dialogue”.

References

1957 births
Living people
Finance ministers of the Central African Republic
Prime Ministers of the Central African Republic
Movement for the Liberation of the Central African People politicians
Central African Republic exiles
Central African Republic expatriates in France
People from Ouham-Pendé